The 2020 Democratic Republic of the Congo attacks were a series of attacks which took place in 2020. The attacks were mostly carried out by the Allied Democratic Forces (ADF), a radical Islamist rebel group and the Cooperative for the Development of Congo (CODECO), an agricultural and religious group made up of ethnic Lendu people. The attacks left at least 1,316 people dead and 132 injured.

Attacks

References

Massacres
21st-century mass murder in Africa
Allied Democratic Forces
April 2020 crimes in Africa
April 2020 events in Africa
Arson in Africa
Arson in the 2020s
February 2020 crimes in Africa
August 2020 crimes in Africa
Islamic terrorist incidents in 2020
Ituri
January 2020 crimes in Africa
January 2020 events in Africa
July 2020 crimes in Africa
September 2020 crimes in Africa
July 2020 events in Africa
June 2020 crimes in Africa
March 2020 crimes in Africa
March 2020 events in Africa
Massacres in 2020
2020
May 2020 crimes in Africa
May 2020 events in Africa
North Kivu
Robberies in Africa
September 2020 events in Africa
South Kivu
Terrorist incidents in Africa in 2020
Terrorist incidents in the Democratic Republic of the Congo